Margaret of Savoy (28 April 1589 – 26 June 1655) was the last Habsburg Vicereine of Portugal from 1634 to 1640. In Portuguese she is known as Duquesa de Mântua, being by marriage the Duchess of Mantua and Montferrat. She was also regent of Montferrat during the minority of her daughter from 1612.

Biography

Duchess of Montferrat
She was born in Turin, as the Fourth child of Charles Emmanuel I, Duke of Savoy (1562–1630) and Infanta Catalina Micaela of Spain, the daughter of Philip II of Spain. She was married to the future Francis IV, Duke of Mantua (1586–1612) and Montferrat on 19 February 1608.  The wedding was celebrated in Turin. In 1612 Margaret's husband succeeded his father, Vincent I, as Duke of Mantua. Their marriage produced three children, but only one daughter, Maria, survived childhood. Francis died in 1612.

Regent of Montferrat
As the couple had no surviving male issue, Duke Francis' next brother succeeded him in the Duchy of Mantua, whereas in the Duchy of Montferrat he was succeeded by his three-year-old daughter Maria, because it had been historically inherited by females, as it was a margraviate of Aleramici origin following a different rule of succession. Indeed, it had been brought to the Mantuan princely dynasty (the House of Gonzaga) by the marriage of Margherita Paleologa, Margravine of Montferrat, in 1531. Accordingly, Maria's claims were asserted and Dowager Duchess Margaret required to be made her regent in Montferrat.

This was a contested inheritance - Maria was a minor for the next decade - and ultimately, Duke Francis' brothers failed to produce any legitimate issue, and the entire inheritance became subject to Mantuan War of Succession (1627–32).

Duchess Margaret's daughter Maria was in 1627 married to Charles of Gonzaga-Nevers, the eldest son of the distant Gonzaga heir-male (at that point Charles I, Duke of Mantua), in order to join two of the Mantuan claims. They had to wage war, but in the end their line prevailed and they commanded universal recognition as Dukes of Mantua and Montferrat.

Vicereine of Portugal
Upon the death in 1633 of her maternal aunt, Archduchess Isabella Clara Eugenia, ruler of the Low Countries, her brother Victor Amadeus became heir to the rights of their maternal grandmother Elisabeth of Valois, eldest daughter and heiress of Henry II of France and Catherine of Medici.

She had ancestral links to Portugal: two of her great-grandmothers (i.e. Empress Isabella and Beatrice, Duchess of Savoy) had been daughters of king Manuel I of Portugal.

Since 1580, the kingdoms of Portugal and Spain had been forcefully joined together, or annexed, under the rule of Philip II of Spain. In an assembly known as the Cortes de Tomar, the Spanish monarch maintained the Portuguese kingdom in an Iberian dynastic union, separate from Spain, and promised some local rule through a viceroy, who was meant to have local ties either to Portugal or the Spanish royal family. After the death in 1635 of the then viceroy, the Count of Basto Diogo de Castro, who had ruled Portugal,  Margaret's cousin, king Philip IV of Spain appointed Margaret as Vicereine of Portugal. She moved to Portugal in 1636. This nomination was the result of the efforts of Diogo Soares, member of the Council of Portugal at Madrid, a friend of the Count-Duke of Olivares and a relative of Miguel de Vasconcelos who, in 1635, would be named secretary of state of Portugal.

As a result of the Portuguese revolution (called the Restoration of Independence) of 1640, Vasconcelos was assassinated and the Duchess of Mantua tried to calm the Portuguese people during demonstrations in the Portuguese Terreiro do Paço (at the time Lisbon's main square). The Portuguese proclaimed the Duke of Braganza as their new king. Margaret was surrounded in her headquarters in Lisbon, and her support collapsing, the new potentate allowed her to depart to Spain.

She died in Miranda de Ebro  in 1655, her daughter Duchess Maria of Rethel and Montferrat surviving her, with two grandchildren, of whom the daughter Eleanor had in 1651 become the Holy Roman Empress and the son Charles in 1637 the reigning duke of Mantua. At her death, both her grandchildren had already produced great-grandchildren for her.

Issue
Margaret had three children:
Maria (29 July 1609 – 14 August 1660); married Charles II Gonzaga, duke of Nevers, in 1627.
Ludovico (21 April 1611 – 3 August 1612).
Eleonora (12 September 1612 – 13 September 1612).

Ancestors

External links

1589 births
1655 deaths
Nobility from Turin
Viceroys of Portugal
Duchesses of Mantua
Duchesses of Montferrat
Princesses of Savoy
House of Gonzaga
17th-century women rulers
Daughters of monarchs